The following is a list of accredited colleges and universities in the U.S. state of Florida. Many of these schools have multiple campuses, and therefore only the location of the main campus in Florida is specified. Most public institutions and traditional private institutions in Florida are accredited by the Southern Association of Colleges and Schools; religious schools are accredited by the Association of Advanced Rabbinical and Talmudic Schools (AARTS), the Association of Theological Schools in the United States and Canada (ATS), the Association for Biblical Higher Education (ABHE), and the Transnational Association of Christian Colleges and Schools (TRACS).

Public colleges and universities

State University System

The State University System of Florida comprises twelve member universities.

 Florida A&M University (Tallahassee)

 Florida Atlantic University (Boca Raton)
 Florida Gulf Coast University (Fort Myers)
 Florida International University (Miami)
 Florida Polytechnic University (Lakeland)
 Florida State University (Tallahassee)
 New College of Florida (Sarasota)
 University of Central Florida (Orlando)
 University of Florida (Gainesville)
 University of North Florida (Jacksonville)
 University of South Florida (Tampa)
 University of West Florida (Pensacola)

Florida College System

The Florida College System comprises twenty-eight community colleges and state colleges.

 Broward College (Davie)
 Chipola College (Marianna)
 College of Central Florida (Ocala)
 Daytona State College (Daytona Beach)
 Eastern Florida State College (Cocoa)
 Florida Gateway College (Lake City)
 College of the Florida Keys (Key West)
 Florida SouthWestern State College (Fort Myers)
 Florida State College at Jacksonville (Jacksonville)
 Gulf Coast State College (Panama City)
 Hillsborough Community College (Tampa)
 Indian River State College (Fort Pierce)
 Lake–Sumter State College (Leesburg)
 Miami Dade College (Miami)
 North Florida Community College (Madison)
 Northwest Florida State College (Niceville)
 Palm Beach State College (Lake Worth)
 Pasco–Hernando State College (New Port Richey)
 Pensacola State College (Pensacola)
 Polk State College (Winter Haven)
 Santa Fe College (Gainesville)
 Seminole State College of Florida (Sanford)
 South Florida State College (Avon Park)
 St. Johns River State College (Palatka)
 St. Petersburg College (St. Petersburg)
 State College of Florida, Manatee–Sarasota (Bradenton)
 Tallahassee Community College (Tallahassee)
 Valencia College (Orlando)

Other public institutions
 George Stone Technical Center (Pensacola)

Private colleges and universities

Private institutions

 Argosy University (Tampa)
 Atlantis University (Miami-Dade County)
 Beacon College (Leesburg)
 Carlos Albizu University (Miami)
 Columbia College (Jacksonville) (Orlando)
 DeVry University (Orlando)
 Embry–Riddle Aeronautical University (Daytona Beach)
 Flagler College (St. Augustine)
 Florida Institute of Technology (Melbourne)
 Florida National University (Hialeah)
 Herzing University (Orlando)
 Hodges University (Naples)
 Jacksonville University (Jacksonville)
 Keiser University (Fort Lauderdale)
 Lake Erie College of Osteopathic Medicine (Bradenton)
 Lynn University (Boca Raton)
 Millennia Atlantic University (Doral)
 Miami International University of Art & Design (Miami)
 Miami Regional University (Miami Springs)
 National Louis University (Tampa)
 National University of Medical Sciences (Naples)
 Nova Southeastern University (Davie)
 Nexus University (Miami)
 Okan International University (Dania Beach)
 Rasmussen College (Ocala, Fort Myers, New Port Richey/West Pasco, Land o' Lakes/East Pasco, and Tampa/Brandon)
 Rollins College (Winter Park)
 San Ignacio University (Doral)
 Schiller International University (Largo)
 Southeastern College (Miami Lakes and West Palm Beach)
 Southern Technical College (Orlando)
 Springfield College (Tampa)
 Stetson University (DeLand)
 University of Miami (Coral Gables)
 University of Phoenix (Orlando)
 University of Tampa (Tampa)
 Webber International University (Babson Park)
 Western Michigan University Cooley Law School (Tampa)

Religiously affiliated institutions

AdventHealth University (Orlando)
 Ave Maria University (Ave Maria)
 Baptist College of Florida (Graceville)
 Barry University (Miami Shores)
 Bethune–Cookman University (Daytona Beach)
Covenant Life University (Fort Myers)
 Eckerd College (St. Petersburg)
 Edward Waters University (Jacksonville, Florida)
 Emmaus Baptist College (Brandon, Florida)
 Florida College (Temple Terrace)
 Florida Memorial University (Miami Gardens)
 Florida Southern College (Lakeland)
 University of Fort Lauderdale (Fort Lauderdale)
 Gordon–Conwell Theological Seminary (Jacksonville)
 Hobe Sound Bible College (Hobe Sound)
 Johnson University Florida (Kissimmee)
 Palm Beach Atlantic University (West Palm Beach)
 Pensacola Christian College (Pensacola)
 Reformed Theological Seminary (Orlando)
 Saint Leo University (St. Leo)
 St. John Vianney College Seminary (Miami)
 St. Thomas University (Miami Gardens)
 South Florida Bible College & Theological Seminary (Deerfield Beach)
 Southeastern University (Lakeland)
 Talmudic University Yeshiva Bais Moshe Chaim (Miami Beach)
 Trinity Baptist College (Jacksonville)
 Trinity College (New Port Richey)
 Warner University (Lake Wales)

Trade/technical institutions

 Acupuncture and Massage College (Miami)
 AdventHealth University (Orlando)
 Aerosim Flight Academy (Sanford)
 American College for Medical Careers (Orlando)
 Atlantic Institute of Oriental Medicine (Fort Lauderdale)
 City College (Fort Lauderdale)
 College of Business and Technology (Miami) a.k.a. "CBT College"
 Digital Media Arts College (Boca Raton)
 Dragon Rises College of Oriental Medicine (Gainesville)
 East West College of Natural Medicine (Sarasota)
 Everest University (Pompano Beach)
 Everglades University (Boca Raton)
 Florida Career College (Miami)
 Florida College of Integrative Medicine (Orlando)
 Florida Technical College (Cutler Bay, DeLand, Kissimmee, Lakeland, Orlando, and Pembroke Pines)
 Full Sail University (Winter Park)
 Jersey College (Tampa, Jacksonville, and Fort Lauderdale)
 Jose Maria Vargas University (Pembroke Pines)
 Miami International University of Art & Design (Miami)
Northwest Lineman College (Edgewater)
 Orlando Culinary Academy (Orlando)
 Remington College (Tampa)
 Ringling College of Art and Design (Sarasota)
 Southern Technical College (Orlando)

Former colleges and universities
The Art Institute of Fort Lauderdale
The Art Institute of Jacksonville 
Clearwater Christian College
Johnson & Wales University - North Miami
Jones College
 Virginia College

Segregated (defunct) junior colleges
Prior to 1968, racially integrated education was prohibited by the Florida Constitution of 1885. In an effort to show that the state of Florida had a separate but equal college system for black people, counties, with state support, established 11 junior colleges for black people; only one already existed (Booker T. Washington). In several cases a new junior college for whites was founded at approximately the same time. The 11 new junior colleges were opened in the late 1950s and early 1960s. They were abruptly closed following passage of the Civil Rights Act of 1964, and the formerly all-white junior colleges, now forced to accept the black students, usually did nothing to make them feel welcome or help them.

 Booker T. Washington Junior College
 Gibbs Junior College
 Roosevelt Junior College
 Carver Junior College
 Jackson Junior College
 Hampton Junior College
 Rosenwald Junior College
 Suwannee River Junior College
 Volusia County Junior College
 Collier-Blocker Junior College
 Lincoln Junior College
 Johnson Junior College

See also

 List of college athletic programs in Florida
Education in Florida
Florida Board of Governors
Florida Department of Education
List of American institutions of higher education
List of colleges and universities in metropolitan Jacksonville

References

External links
 Department of Education listing of accredited institutions in Florida

Florida, List of colleges and universities in
Universities and colleges